Panteleimon Kulish Gymnasium is a public gymnasium school in Borzna, Ukraine, founded in 1912.

Sources 

Ukrainian publishing center "Galaxy-s"
Gymnasium named Panteleimon Kulish Borzna Borznyansky City District Council of Chernihiv region
Ukrainian legal portal
Gymnasium named Panteleimon Kulish Borzna Borznyansky City District Council of Chernihiv region
About naming Panteleimon Kulish Gymnasium Borzna

Educational institutions established in 1912
1912 establishments in the Russian Empire
Gymnasiums in Ukraine